Ponui Island (also known as Chamberlin's Island) is a privately owned island located in the Hauraki Gulf, to the east of the city of Auckland, New Zealand. It is located to the southeast of Waiheke Island, at the eastern end of the Tamaki Strait, which separates the island from the Hunua Ranges on the mainland to the south.

The New Zealand Ministry for Culture and Heritage gives a translation of "long night" for Pōnui. The island is the site of some of the earliest archaeological remains of early Māori in the Auckland region, dating to at least the 1400s.

The island has an area of 18 km2 and has been farmed by the Chamberlin family since 1853. The island now consists of three farms, two owned by the Chamberlin family and one by John Spencer. The only permanent inhabitants (nine in the 2001 census) are associated with the farms which are predominantly used for sheep. From the 1880s until the early 20th century, stone and sand from the island was extracted for use in concrete structures in Auckland.

The island is a popular site for youth camps for organisations such as Scouts. Crusader camps (now under the banner of Scripture Union) have been held on the island since 1932.

The island is the home of New Zealand's only feral donkey breed, the Ponui donkey.  It also has a large population of kiwi.

Shipwrecks 
Ponui Island is home to the Shipwreck of the Pupuke.

References 

Islands of the Hauraki Gulf
Islands of the Auckland Region
Private islands of New Zealand
Populated places around the Hauraki Gulf / Tīkapa Moana